Iran has a very varied climate and a large variety of plants. More than 13 percent of the country is covered by forests. The list below is a just a start and is yet to be completed:

Anacardiaceae
Pistacia vera
Aquifoliaceae
Ilex aquifolium
Arecaceae
Phoenix dactylifera
Betulaceae
Betula medwediewii
Betula pendula
Alnus glutinosa
Alnus incana
Alnus subcordata
Carpinus betulus
Carpinus orientalis
Corylus colurna
Ostrya carpinifolia
Buxaceae
Buxus hyrcana
Buxus sempervirens
Celtidaceae
Celtis caucasica
Celtis australis
Cupressaceae
Cupressus sempervirens
Juniperus communis
Juniperus excelsa
Juniperus foetidissima
Juniperus excelsa
Juniperus oxycedrus
Juniperus sabina
Platycladus orientalis (introduced by man)
Ebenaceae
Diospyros lotus
Elaeagnaceae
Elaeagnus angustifolia
Fabaceae
Albizia julibrissin
Cercis siliquastrum
Gleditsia caspica
Fagaceae
Castanea sativa
Fagus orientalis
Quercus boissieri
Quercus calliprinos
Quercus castaneifolia
Quercus macranthera
Quercus petraea
Quercus pontica
Quercus robur
Hamamelidaceae
Parrotia persica
Juglandaceae
Juglans regia
Pterocarya fraxinifolia
Lauraceae
Laurus nobilis
Lythraceae
Punica granatum
Malvaceae
Tilia platyphyllos subsp. caucasica
Tilia tomentosa
Moraceae
Ficus carica
Morus alba
Morus nigra
Oleaceae
Fraxinus angustifolia var. oxycarpa
Fraxinus excelsior
Fraxinus ornus
Olea europaea
Pinaceae
Pinus brutia
"Picea orientalis"
Platanaceae
Platanus orientalis
Punicaceae
Punica granatum
Rhamnaceae
Paliurus spina-christi
Rhamnus pallasii
Rosaceae
Crataegus laciniata
Crataegus tanacetifolia
Cydonia vulgaris
Malus domestica
Mespilus germanica
Prunus armeniaca
Prunus cerasifera
Prunus cerasus
Prunus dulcis
Prunus laurocerasus
Prunus persica (introduced by man)
Prunus spinosa
Pyrus communis
Sorbus aucuparia
Sorbus torminalis
Rutaceae
Citrus aurantium
Citrus decumana
Citrus delicivsus
Citrus limonum (lime)
Citrus limonum var. dulcis
Salicaceae
Populus alba
Populus euphratica
Populus nigra var. afghanica
Salix alba
Salix daphnoides
Salix viminalis
Sapindaceae
Acer campestre
Acer cappadocicum
Acer hyrcanum
Acer tataricum
Acer trautvetteri
Acer velutinum
Taxaceae
Taxus baccata
Ulmaceae
Ulmus carpinifolia
Ulmus glabra
Zelkova carpinifolia
Vitaceae
Vitis vinifera

See also 
 
 Flora of the Indian epic period

External links
Irantreeshrub.com: Trees and Shrubs of Iran website

.Trees
.Iran
Trees
Iran
Forests of Iran